Luis and Clark, or L&C, is a small, family-run company that sells carbon fiber stringed instruments invented and designed by cellist Luis Leguía (Louie) of the Boston Symphony Orchestra. Their line consists of a violin, viola, cello and double bass, and they have recently started producing half-sized cellos, with plans for a classical guitar currently in development.

History 
Throughout his extensive career as a cellist, Leguía never found a suitable cello that could project over an orchestra or a grand piano.

Leguía, an avid sailor, was on his catamaran one day in 1989 when he heard a resonant humming sound - and noticed that the sound of the waves against the carbon fiber was louder than it was against wood. Struck with the realization that he could create his life's ideal cello, he built three prototypes by hand in his basement, the first with fiberglass and the other two with carbon fiber. After five years of experimenting, he approached carbon fiber expert Steve Clark, head of Rhode Island's Vanguard Sailboats, to form the company "Luis and Clark" in 2000. Clark eventually lead Leguía to Matt Dunham of Clear Carbon and Components, who continues to manufacture all the Luis and Clark instruments.

Instruments 
The instruments are all made in the United States with high-quality 92.57% carbon-epoxy matrix. Due to their carbon fiber, they are much lighter than their wooden counterparts, immune to changes in weather, and highly resistant to damage (10x stronger than steel, 5x lighter). A cello owned by Kaaren Makas, (37 years principal cello, New Orleans Philharmonic, Emeritus principal, Louisiana Philharmonic) survived the flood waters of Hurricane Katrina, needing only new strings, bridge and soundpost, after spending two weeks under water. Each one is set up carefully by hand with the highest quality bridges that are hand-carved to fit each unique instrument, and are tested thoroughly before being sent out.

They are designed to be held closer to the body in order to reduce fatigue, a result of less material used in the instruments' creation. The company has stated that the instruments' sound is most important, and the durability and resistance to climate are "happy side-effects."

The instruments are 100% vegan (traditional instruments use animal glues), and does not use any endangered ebony wood in the fingerboards, nuts and saddles.

Luis and Clark has sold over a thousand cellos, as well as hundreds of other carbon-fiber-stringed instruments, and has owners in 54 countries.

Cello 
The shape of the Luis and Clark cello makes it easier to play. It is played closer to the body so the bow arm does not have to be so high at the point of the A string, thus reducing one of the causes of the “sore shoulder syndrome.” There is no sharp edge from the cello neck rubbing against the musician’s chest, making this cello more comfortable to play.

Violin 
Weighing less than a pound, the violin brings together the best of the violins Leguía most admired in his 60 years as a professional musician. He was most influenced by Joseph Guarnerius del Gesù, but the Luis and Clark violin also has characteristics from Amati, Montagnana, Stradivarius, J.B. Guadagnini and the rest of the Guarneri family.

Viola 
Weighing only 1 pound 4 ounces, much kinder to the body than traditional violas. It is 11/32 of an inch narrower on the A string shoulder, making it easier to play in the upper positions. The viola has an amazingly beautiful, dark, yet vibrant resonance. It sings out effortlessly and powerfully. The lower registers are rich, the upper register has luxurious warmth and there is an evenness of sound across the strings. The overall tone is one of depth, power, beauty and resonance that has to be heard to be believed.

Bass 
The bass is a ¾ bass and weighs about 19 pounds. The string length is 41½ inches. It has a swell back and is composed of a one piece back, sides and neck; the second piece is the top and the third is the fingerboard. It is a “free adaptation” of the bass Louie thinks is the best in the Boston Symphony, an Antonio Roca bass. It is a bit asymmetrical in the upper bout, making it easier to play. It has Rubner nickel tyrolean style tuners.

The bass has a robust sound and can go from zero degrees into a hot dry room or to a hot humid country and not lose its sound, not crack nor have its neck come loose.

Notable players

Cellists 

Yo-Yo Ma

2Cellos

Michael Bacon (The Bacon Brothers)

Steven Sharp Nelson (The Piano Guys)

Alana Henderson (Hozier)

Brent Kutzle (OneRepublic)

Erik Friedlander

Cremaine Booker (The Cello Guy)

Michael Levin (Cirque du Soleil)

Violinists 

Lindsey Stirling

Taylor Davis

Philip Heyman (Principal Violist of the Welsh National Opera)

Marissa Licata (Rock violinist)

Lisa Ferrigno (Concertmaster of Brevard Symphony Orchestra)

Brynn Albanese (Cafe Musique)

Violists 

Jasmine Beams (Solo Viola of the Turku Philharmonic Orchestra)

Niklas Schwarz (Principal Violist of the Essener Philharmoniker and violist of the Mannheimer Streichquartett)

Bassists 

Ann Gilbert

References

External links
Luis and Clark website

Musical instrument manufacturing companies of the United States